Good Food was a cookery channel broadcasting in the United Kingdom and Ireland, latterly as part of the Discovery, Inc. network of channels. The channel originally launched on 5 November 2001 and relaunched in its final format on 22 June 2009. Good Food was available on satellite through Sky, on cable through Virgin Media, and through IPTV with TalkTalk TV, BT TV. From 2015 to 2018, Good Food was temporarily rebranded as Christmas Food during the festive season.

Good Food ceased operations on 12 September 2019, with all its programmes moving to Food Network.

History
UKTV announced the launch of UK Food on 11 July 2001, as the first offshoot channel for UK Style, being dedicated to cookery programmes that had previously been broadcast on the increasingly crowded UK Style. The channel eventually launched 5 November 2001, and broadcast within 7am-7pm every day, timesharing with UK Drama. The channel soon expanded its hours to 5am-9pm, before gaining a full 24-hour slot. On 8 March 2004, the channel rebranded as UKTV Food.

The channel used a large amount of programming from the BBC's programme archive, and was similar to a former international channel run by BBC Worldwide called BBC Food, as both use similar programming and both have a similar format.

As part of the rebranding of all UKTV's channels to a unique name and identity, UKTV Food rebranded as Good Food on 22 June 2009, the last of UKTV's brands to do so. The name was based on that of the BBC Good Food cookery magazine, published by Immediate Media Company. The channel and the magazine continued to be operated separately.

Acquisistion by Discovery and closure

On 1 April 2019, it was announced that UKTV co-owner Discovery Inc. would acquire the BBC's stake in Good Food. They took it over along with sister channels Home and Really in June.

On 5 September 2019, Discovery announced that Good Food would merge with Food Network and close on 12 September 2019, with its programmes moving to the sister channel. Good Food was removed from Virgin Media on 11 September, while the channel itself was shut down on 12 September 2019, after which the channel space created in 2001 by UK Food ceased to exist. The last programme shown was an episode of Choccywoccydoodah.

Subsidiary channels

Good Food +1
Alongside the main channel, a time shift channel was also operated: Good Food +1. Corresponding to the name on the main channel, it shows all programming from the channel one hour later, with no special idents or continuity used.

The channel launched on Sky Digital as UK Food +1 on 12 November 2003, airing between 6am-7pm daily, before expanding fully like its main channel. It was later named UKTV Food +1 before going with its final name.

Good Food HD
On 13 July 2009, Virgin Media revealed that they were "currently in active talks" with UKTV about launching a high-definition version of Good Food on their cable television platform. Good Food HD launched on 31 August 2010 on Sky, broadcasting a HD simulcast of the channel's schedule. As part of Virgin Media's deal to sell its share of UKTV, all five of UKTV's HD channels were added to Virgin's cable television service by 2012. Good Food HD was added to Virgin Media on 7 October 2011.

On-air identity

When UK Food channel launched in 2001, the channel adopted a branding package based around circular shaped foods with a spiral pattern located in the centre when looked at from above. The channel's logo at the time featured the name, stylised as UK Food, and a two lined spiral extending outwards from the right of the name. The majority of UKTV channels had some pattern located there to distinguish the channel, and this spiral also featured in the idents themselves as well as channel promotions.

Following the rebranding as UKTV Food, the channel's identity was altered. The swirling motif was retained within the idents themselves: indeed many of the previous idents survived rebrand reuse. The primary difference was the addition of the two lined UKTV logo, aligned to the left of the screen. The channels colour was orange, and was used in different shades as the background colour to all promotion end boards and static slides both on the channel and for promotion across the network.

Following the rebrand to Good Food, the idents changed to sequences involving the coming together of ingredients to events such as a picnic barbecue, a dinner party and a family Sunday roast. The idents finished with an endboard featuring the circular Good Food logo in the centre of a screen with food imagery in the background, such as fish outlines, knife and fork or wine glasses.

Former programming
The channel aired programming from the, BBC ITV and Channel 4 programming archive and programming aired on other domestic and international channels bought in by the channel. These programmes included:
4 Ingredients
Ace of Cakes
Alive and Cooking
Barefoot Contessa
Chefs in the City
Choccywoccydoodah
Dinner Impossible
Everyday Gourmet with Justine Schofield
Good Chef Bad Chef
Iron Chef Australia
James Martin's Brittany
James Martin's Mediterranean
Luke Nguyen's Vietnam
Man v. Food
Market Kitchen
Mary Berry at Home
MasterChef (Now shown on BBC One)
MasterChef Australia (Now shown on W)
MasterChef Ireland
Mitch and Matt's Big Fish
Monster Munchies
My Restaurant Rules
New British Kitchen
Nigella Bites
Nigellissima
Oliver's Twist
Paul Hollywood's Bread
Rachel Allen: Bake!
Rhodes Across India
Rhodes Across Italy
Rhodes Across the Caribbean
Saturday Kitchen
A Taste of the Caribbean
The Best in Australia
Top Chef
Top Chef: Just Desserts
World's Weirdest Restaurants
The Great British Bake Off

Website
The Good Food website, originally devised and launched by Ian Fenn and Ally Branley, provided information on programmes shown on the channel, recipes, message boards, and a wine club. Recipes came from the various shows on Good Food and some included videos taken from the demonstrations. In September 2006 Good Food's website overtook the BBC Food site in popularity for the first time, achieving a 10% market share, compared to BBC Food's 9.63% share. The channel's website now redirects to Food Network's UK website.

See also
 UKTV
 Television in the United Kingdom
 BBC Food
 BBC Magazines

References

External links
Good Food at TVARK 

Television channels and stations established in 2001
Television channels and stations disestablished in 2019
Warner Bros. Discovery networks
Defunct television channels in the United Kingdom
UKTV
UKTV channels